Neochloris terrestris is a microalga species in the genus Neochloris.

References

External links

Sphaeropleales